Borboletta is the sixth studio album by the American Latin rock band Santana. It is one of their jazz-funk-fusion oriented albums, along with Caravanserai (1972), and Welcome (1973). Non-band albums by Carlos Santana in this style also include Love Devotion Surrender (1973) with John McLaughlin and Illuminations (1974) with Alice Coltrane, Jack DeJohnette and Jules Broussard. The guitarist leaves much room to percussion, saxophone and keyboards to set moods ("Spring Manifestations"), as well as lengthy solos by himself ("Promise of a Fisherman") and vocals ("Give and Take", a funky guitar-led song). The record was released in a metallic blue sleeve displaying a butterfly, an allusion to the album Butterfly Dreams (1973) by Brazilian musician Flora Purim and her husband Airto Moreira, whose contributions deeply influenced the sound of Borboletta. In Portuguese, borboleta means "butterfly".

Original bassist David Brown returned to replace Doug Rauch and vocalist/keyboardist Leon Patillo joined. After the album's completion, drummer Michael Shrieve left, to be replaced by Leon "Ndugu" Chancler, who had guested on parts of the album.

Track listing

Side one

Side two

Personnel
 Leon Patillo – vocals (3,4,5,7,8), piano (8), electric piano (3,5), organ (4)
 Flora Purim – vocals (1,11)
 Jules Broussard – soprano and tenor saxophones (4,6,9,11)
 Carlos Santana – guitar (3-5,7-11) percussion (2,9), congas (7), gong (8), vocals (11), producer
 Tom Coster – piano (4,9), Hammond organ (7,10,11), electric piano Fender Rhodes (2,9-11), organ (3,5,6,8), Moog synthesizer (4,8), producer
 Stanley Clarke – bass guitar (6,9-11)
 David Brown – bass guitar (2,4,5,7,8)
 Michael Shrieve – drums (2-5,7,8), producer 
 Leon "Ndugu" Chancler – drums (6,9)
 Airto Moreira – drums (10,11),  percussion (12), sound effects (1), triangle (11), vocals (12)
 Armando Peraza – percussion, congas (2,4,5,6,8,11), bongos (3,6,11), soprano saxophone (10)
 José Areas – timbales (4), congas (2,3)
 Michael Carpenter – echoplex (2)

Airto Moreira and Flora Purim appear courtesy of CTI Records

Charts

Certifications

References

Santana (band) albums
1974 albums
Columbia Records albums